Edward Donnall "Don" Thomas (March 15, 1920 – October 20, 2012) was an American physician, professor emeritus at the University of Washington, and director emeritus of the clinical research division at the Fred Hutchinson Cancer Research Center. In 1990 he shared the Nobel Prize in Physiology or Medicine with Joseph E. Murray for the development of cell and organ transplantation. Thomas and his wife and research partner Dottie Thomas developed bone marrow transplantation as a treatment for leukemia.

Biography
Born in Mart, Texas, Thomas often shadowed his father who was a general practice doctor.
Later, he attended the University of Texas at Austin where he studied chemistry and chemical engineering, graduating with a Bachelor of Arts in 1941 and a Master's degree in 1943. While Thomas was an undergraduate he met his wife, Dorothy (Dottie) Martin while she was training to be journalist. They had three children. Thomas entered Harvard Medical School in 1943, receiving an Doctor of Medicine in 1946. Dottie became a lab technician during this time to support the family, and the pair worked closely thereafter. He did his residency at Peter Bent Brigham Hospital before serving two years in the United States Army as an internist stationed in Germany. "In 1955, he was appointed physician in chief at the Mary Imogene Bassett Hospital, now Bassett Medical Center, in Cooperstown, New York, an affiliate of Columbia University."

At Mary Imogene Bassett, he began to study rodents that received lethal doses of radiation who were then saved by an infusion of marrow cells. At the time, patients who underwent bone marrow transplantation all died from infections or immune reactions that weren't seen in the rodent studies. Thomas began to use dogs as a model system. In 1963, he moved his lab to the United States Public Health Service in Seattle.

Thomas also received National Medal of Science in 1990. In 2003 he was one of 22 Nobel laureates who signed the Humanist Manifesto.

He died of heart failure.

Awards and honors

1965-1969 Hematology Study Section, National Institutes of Health
1969-1973 Member, Board of Trustees and Medical and Scientific Advisory Committee, Leukemia Society of America, Inc.
1970-1974 Clinical Cancer Investigation Review Committee, National Cancer Institute
1974 First Annual Eugene C. Eppinger Lecture at Peter Bent Brigham Hospital and the Harvard Medical School
1975 A. Ross McIntyre Award, University of Nebraska Medical Center
1975 The Henry M. Stratton Lecture, American Society of Hematology, Dallas
1977 The Lilly Lecture, Royal College of Physicians, London
1979 The Philip Levine Award, American Society of Clinical Pathologists, New Orleans
1980 American Cancer Society Award for Distinguished Service in Basic Research
1981 Kettering Prize of the General Motors Cancer Research Foundation for contributions to the diagnosis and treatment of cancer
1981 Honorary Doctorate of Medicine, University of Cagliari, Sardinia
1981 Special Keynote Address Award, American Society of Therapeutic Radiologists
1982 Stratton Lecture, International Society of Hematology
1982 Paul Aggeler Lecturer, University of California, San Francisco
1983 David A. Karnofsky Memorial Lecturer, Annual Meeting of the American Society of Clinical Oncology
1983 Robert Roesler de Villiers Award, Leukemia Society of American
1984 Sixty-fifth Mellon Lecturer, University of Pittsburgh School of Medicine, May 13
1985 Stanley Wright Memorial Lecturer, Annual Meeting of the Western Society for Pediatric Research
1987 Karl Landsteiner Memorial Award, Annual Meeting of the American Association of Blood Banks,
1987-1988 President, American Society of Hematology
1989 Elected Corresponding Member, Academie Royale de Medecine de Belgigue
1990 Terry Fox Award, Canada
1990 Gairdner Foundation International Award
1990 North American Medical Association of Hong Kong Prize
1990 Nobel Prize in Medicine
1990 Presidential Medal of Science
1991 Adolfo Ferrata Lecture, Italian Society of Hematology, Verona, Italy
1991 Honorary Doctorate of Medicine, University of Verona
1992 Kober Medal, American Association of Physicians
1992 Honorary Member, The Royal College of Physicians and Surgeons of Canada
1992 Honorary Doctorate of Medicine, University of Parma
1993 Golden Plate Award of the American Academy of Achievement
1994 Honorary Member, National Academia of Medicine
1994 Honorary Degree, University of Barcelona
1996 Honorary Degree, University of Warsaw
1998 Medal of Merit, State of Washington

References

External links
Fred Hutchinson Cancer Research Center. Nobel Prize: The Don and Dottie Story
 including the Nobel Lecture 8 December 1990 Bone Marrow Transplantation - Past, Present and Future
 

1920 births
2012 deaths
Members of the United States National Academy of Sciences
University of Washington faculty
Nobel laureates in Physiology or Medicine
American Nobel laureates
American hematologists
National Medal of Science laureates
Harvard Medical School alumni
Columbia University people
Physicians of Brigham and Women's Hospital
United States Army Medical Corps officers
Presidents of the American Society of Hematology